Senarath Adahasin was king of the Kingdom of Kandy from 1604 to 1635. He is said to be the successor to king Wimaladharmasuriya I of Kandy. However first hand accounts are not available concerning what happened after the death of Vimaladharmasuriya I. He is said to be a cousin or brother of Vimaladharmasuriya according to most sources. He was not a legitimate ruler hence he married not only the deceased king’s widow Dona Katherina but also her two daughters, in order to legitimize his claim to the throne.

He did not possess the qualities of a king and during his time Portuguese forces laid waste to Kandyan territory in  frequent invasions, which he could not effectively repulse. During his reign several rebellions rose up against him and to quell those he aligned with the Portuguese. Many of his military campaigns ended in failure with the exception of the Battle of Randenivela, the success of which was however largely due to Prince Kumarasinghe, his son.

When the time came for him to divide his kingdom between his two stepsons & his own son, he tricked the other two & made Rajasinghe II (his own son) inherit the main part of his kingdom including Kandy. His two stepsons died shortly afterwards - some say Senerath was responsible for this elimination of potential heirs. Rajasinghe II thus became the sole heir to his kingdom.

See also
 Mahavamsa
 List of monarchs of Sri Lanka
 History of Sri Lanka
 Kingdom of Kandy

References

Sources
 Kings & Rulers of Sri Lanka

Sinhalese kings
1635 deaths
Sri Lankan Buddhists
 Sinhalese Buddhist monarchs
Monarchs of Kandy
Year of birth unknown
House of Dinajara
17th-century Sinhalese monarchs